Lacombe is a city in central Alberta, Canada. The city is set in the rolling parkland of central Alberta, between the Rocky Mountains foothills to the west and the flatter Alberta prairie to the east.

Lacombe became Alberta's 17th city on September 5, 2010.

History 

Lacombe is named after Albert Lacombe (28 February 1827 — 12 December 1916), a French-Canadian Roman Catholic Oblate missionary who lived among and evangelized the Cree and Blackfoot First Nations of western Canada. He is now remembered for having brokered a peace between the Cree and Blackfoot, negotiating construction of the Canadian Pacific Railway through Blackfoot territory, and securing a promise from the Blackfoot leader Crowfoot to refrain from joining the North-West Rebellion of 1885. The Lacombe Police Service have policed the community since 1900.

The first permanent settler, Ed Barnett, arrived in 1883. Barnett was a retired member of the North-West Mounted Police (NWMP) who had served a mere three years. He left Fort Macleod in August 1881 at 23 years of age. According to his own diary and his official obituary in the RCMP Quarterly, spring 1940, on July 19, 1881, Barnett was among a small NWMP party that escorted Chief Sitting Bull and his people to the Canada–US border. Along the Calgary-Edmonton Trail, he established a "stopping house" for travelers on a land grant given to him for serving in the NWMP. His family and friends moved out of Ontario and the community began to grow. The stopping house then became known as Barnett's Siding.

The Canadian Pacific Railway reached the area in 1891. This provided better access to the area and new opportunities for settlement. By 1893, the downtown blocks and lots were surveyed. Village status was granted in 1896, and town status in 1902.

In 1907, the federal government set up an experimental farm to research grain and livestock production. The President of the C.P.R., William Van Horne, renamed Barnett's Siding to Lacombe in honour of Father Lacombe.

Geography

Climate 
Lacombe experiences a humid continental climate (Köppen climate classification Dfb).

Demographics 

Economy 
Nestled in one of Central Alberta's most fertile valleys between Calgary and Edmonton, the local economy includes a strong agricultural base supplemented by oil and gas industry.

The city is also home to the Lacombe Research and Development Centre where the first livestock breed developed in Canada, the Lacombe hog, was produced.

Lacombe Research and Development Centre 
For more than a century, the federal government has funded agricultural research through a network of research centres strategically placed in almost every province. This research program has played a major role in developing the more than $120-billion Canadian agrifood industry.

The Lacombe Research and Development Centre (LRDC) is one of a network of 20 national agricultural research centres operated by Agriculture and Agri-Food Canada. The Centre conducts research in field crops and livestock production relevant to the central Alberta region. The Centre's main research focuses on the factors that influence red meat: yield, quality, safety and preservation. The Centre also develops integrated, sustainable crop and animal production systems and crop varieties for the short-season environments of the parkland and northwestern Canada.

The LRDC developed a variety of hog called Lacombe. Work began in 1947. It took 12 years to develop the 'Lacombe' variety which is noted for its characteristics suitable to the harsh prairie environment. 'Lacombe' is 55% Danish Landrace, 22% Chester White, and 23% Berkshire. The 'Lacombe' hog was the first livestock breed to be developed in Canada.

Sports 
The Lacombe Generals of Allan Cup Hockey West played out of the Gary Moe Auto Group Sportsplex from 2016–19. Jeff Purdy also played volleyball for the SAIT Trojans from 1998-2000.

Government

Lacombe Police Service 
The Lacombe Police Service (LPS) is the municipal police force for the City of Lacombe. Founded in 1900, the LPS is one of Alberta's eldest police forces. As of 2020, the LPS has 21 police officers, an Alberta Law Enforcement Response Team member, and 13 civilian staff (full-time, part-time, and casual). The current chief of police is Lorne Blumhagen.

Education 

Lacombe's Seventh-day Adventist university, Burman University (formerly Canadian University College), was established near Lacombe in 1909 and continues to operate today. It and the former Hamlet of College Heights were annexed by Lacombe in 2000.

Lacombe is home to many public schools within the Wolf Creek Public School Division, including École Secondaire Lacombe Composite High School – a Grade 10-12 school with approximately 800 students that recently underwent extensive renovations completed in 2009. Other public schools include École J.S. McCormick School (K-3), École Lacombe Upper Elementary School (4-6), Terrace Ridge School (K-7), École Lacombe Junior High School (7-9), and Lacombe Outreach School.

Lacombe's private schools include Lacombe Christian School (Preschool-Grade 9) and it has two campuses one for pre-2 and the other side from 3-9, Central Alberta Christian High School (10-12), College Heights Christian School (K-9) and Parkview Adventist Academy (10-12), as well as Father Lacombe Catholic School (K-9).

Architecture 

Several times, the main street of this community has been used in films, since it was remodelled to resemble a town in the early 1900s. Lacombe's Main Street is lined with restored Edwardian buildings in the downtown. Most prominent of these is the Flatiron Building which today houses the Flatiron Museum and Interpretive Centre. The downtown area also has the oldest operating blacksmith shop, which is now the Lacombe Blacksmith Shop Museum and the Michener House Museum and Archives, which is the oldest remaining building in Lacombe as well as the birthplace of the Rt. Hon. Roland Michener, Canada's Governor General from 1967–1974.

Notable people 
 One of Lacombe's most famous residents was Roland Michener, Governor General of Canada from 1967 to 1974. A local museum and park, Michener House and Michener Park, commemorate his legacy as one of Canada's most famous and influential Governors General.
Anna Maria Kaufmann, an international opera singer now living in Germany was raised in Lacombe.
Maureen Kubinec, Member of the Legislative Assembly of Alberta for Barrhead-Morinville-Westlock, 2012 - 2015
 Irene Parlby helped to found the first women's local of the United Farmers of Alberta in 1913. In 1921, she was elected to the Alberta Legislature for the riding of Lacombe, holding the riding for 14 years. Appointed as minister without portfolio, she was the first woman Cabinet minister in Alberta. Parlby was one of the Famous Five who by means of a court battle known as the Persons Case established that women were "qualified Persons" in the meaning of the Constitution of Canada and therefore entitled to sit in the Senate of Canada. A lifelong advocate for rural Canadian women and children, Parlby was president of the United Farm Women of Alberta from 1916 to 1919. On behalf of the UFWA, she pushed to improve public health care services and establish municipal hospitals as well as mobile medical and dental clinics. In 1930, she represented Canada at the League of Nations. She is the first woman to receive an Honorary Doctorate of Laws from the University of Alberta.
 Lacombe is home to country music recording artist Gord Bamford.
 The comedian Tony Law is originally from Lacombe, although he is now best known for his work in the United Kingdom.
 Birthplace of Rob Cookson, professional hockey coach who has coached over 900 games in the NHL.
 Jack Cookson, member of the Legislative Assembly of Alberta from 1971 to 1982, and Minister of the Environment from 1979 to 1982.

References

Further reading 
 Barnett, Doug. Ed Barnett: from mountie to rancher. Alberta History. Jun 22, 2007. Accessed 03-20-2011.

External links 

 
1896 establishments in Alberta
Cities in Alberta
Populated places established in 1896